The Danish Mixed Curling Championship is the national championship of mixed curling (two men and two women) in Denmark. It has been held annually since 1978.

List of champions and medallists
(teams line-up in order: fourth, third, second, lead, alternate, coach; skips marked bold)

Medal record for curlers
(after 2019 championship)

References

See also
Danish Men's Curling Championship
Danish Women's Curling Championship
Danish Mixed Doubles Curling Championship
Danish Junior Curling Championships
Danish Senior Curling Championships

Curling competitions in Denmark
Recurring sporting events established in 1978
1978 establishments in Denmark
National curling championships
Curling
Mixed curling